Novisuccinea ovalis, commonly called the oval ambersnail, is a species of air-breathing land snail, a terrestrial pulmonate gastropod mollusk in the family Succineidae, the ambersnails.

Distribution
This species occurs in North America.

Parasites
Parasites of Novisuccinea ovalis include:
 Leucochloridium variae

References

External links
 Hoagland K. E. & Davis G. M. (1987). "The succineid snail fauna of Chittenango Falls, New York: taxonomic status with comparisons to other relevant taxa". Proceedings of the Academy of Natural Sciences of Philadelphia 139: 465-526.
 Pilsbry H. A. (1908). "Notes on Succinea ovalis Say and Succinea obliqua Say". Proceedings of the Academy of Natural Sciences of Philadelphia 60: 45-51 + pl. 7.

Succineidae
Molluscs of North America
Fauna of the Great Lakes region (North America)
Gastropods described in 1817